Max Rico Barnofsky (born 5 March 1995) is a German footballer who plays as a defender for Italian club Cittanova Interpiana.

Career
On 2 July 2018, he moved to Italy, joining Serie B club Carpi on a one-year contract with additional two-year extension option.

On 11 July 2019, he joined Gozzano.

On 1 July 2020, he moved to FC Messina.

References

External links
 
 

Living people
1995 births
German footballers
Footballers from Berlin
Association football defenders
3. Liga players
Serie C players
Hallescher FC players
A.C. Carpi players
A.C. Gozzano players
S.S.D. F.C. Messina players
A.S.D. Cittanova Interpiana Calcio players
German expatriate footballers
German expatriate sportspeople in Italy
Expatriate footballers in Italy